Structured Query Language, abbreviated as SQL ( S-Q-L, sometimes  "sequel" for historical reasons), is a domain-specific language used in programming and designed for managing data held in a relational database management system (RDBMS), or for stream processing in a relational data stream management system (RDSMS). It is particularly useful in handling structured data, i.e. data incorporating relations among entities and variables.

SQL offers two main advantages over older read–write APIs such as ISAM or VSAM. Firstly, it introduced the concept of accessing many records with one single command. Secondly, it eliminates the need to specify how to reach a record, e.g. with or without an index.

Originally based upon relational algebra and tuple relational calculus, SQL consists of many types of statements, which may be informally classed as sublanguages, commonly: a data query language (DQL), a data definition language (DDL), a data control language (DCL), and a data manipulation language (DML). The scope of SQL includes data query, data manipulation (insert, update, and delete), data definition (schema creation and modification), and data access control. Although SQL is essentially a declarative language (4GL), it also includes procedural elements.

SQL was one of the first commercial languages to use Edgar F. Codd’s relational model. The model was described in his influential 1970 paper, "A Relational Model of Data for Large Shared Data Banks".  Despite not entirely adhering to the relational model as described by Codd, it became the most widely used database language.

SQL became a standard of the American National Standards Institute (ANSI) in 1986 and of the International Organization for Standardization (ISO) in 1987. Since then, the standard has been revised to include a larger set of features. Despite the existence of standards, most SQL code requires at least some changes before being ported to different database systems.

History

SQL was initially developed at IBM by Donald D. Chamberlin and Raymond F. Boyce after learning about the relational model from Edgar F. Codd in the early 1970s. This version, initially called SEQUEL (Structured English Query Language), was designed to manipulate and retrieve data stored in IBM's original quasirelational database management system, System R, which a group at IBM San Jose Research Laboratory had developed during the 1970s.

Chamberlin and Boyce's first attempt at a relational database language was SQUARE (Specifying Queries in A Relational Environment), but it was difficult to use due to subscript/superscript notation. After moving to the San Jose Research Laboratory in 1973, they began work on a sequel to SQUARE. The original name SEQUEL,  which is widely regarded as a pun on QUEL, the query language of Ingres, was later changed to SQL (dropping the vowels) because "SEQUEL" was a trademark of the UK-based Hawker Siddeley Dynamics Engineering Limited company.  The label SQL later became the acronym for Structured Query Language.

After testing SQL at customer test sites to determine the usefulness and practicality of the system, IBM began developing commercial products based on their System R prototype, including System/38, SQL/DS, and IBM Db2, which were commercially available in 1979, 1981, and 1983, respectively.

In the late 1970s, Relational Software, Inc. (now Oracle Corporation) saw the potential of the concepts described by Codd, Chamberlin, and Boyce, and developed their own SQL-based RDBMS with aspirations of selling it to the U.S. Navy, Central Intelligence Agency, and other U.S. government agencies. In June 1979, Relational Software introduced one of the first commercially available implementations of SQL, Oracle V2 (Version2) for VAX computers.

By 1986, ANSI and ISO standard groups officially adopted the standard "Database Language SQL" language definition. New versions of the standard were published in 1989, 1992, 1996, 1999, 2003, 2006, 2008, 2011, and most recently, 2016.

Syntax

The SQL language is subdivided into several language elements, including:

 Clauses, which are constituent components of statements and queries. (In some cases, these are optional.)
 Expressions, which can produce either scalar values, or tables consisting of columns and rows of data
 Predicates, which specify conditions that can be evaluated to SQL three-valued logic (3VL) (true/false/unknown) or Boolean truth values and are used to limit the effects of statements and queries, or to change program flow.
 Queries, which retrieve the data based on specific criteria. This is an important element of SQL.
 Statements, which may have a persistent effect on schemata and data, or may control transactions, program flow, connections, sessions, or diagnostics.
 SQL statements also include the semicolon (";") statement terminator. Though not required on every platform, it is defined as a standard part of the SQL grammar.
 Insignificant whitespace is generally ignored in SQL statements and queries, making it easier to format SQL code for readability.

Procedural extensions

SQL is designed for a specific purpose: to query data contained in a relational database. SQL is a set-based, declarative programming language, not an imperative programming language like C or BASIC. However, extensions to Standard SQL add procedural programming language functionality, such as control-of-flow constructs. These include:

In addition to the standard SQL/PSM extensions and proprietary SQL extensions, procedural and object-oriented programmability is available on many SQL platforms via DBMS integration with other languages. The SQL standard defines SQL/JRT extensions (SQL Routines and Types for the Java Programming Language) to support Java code in SQL databases. Microsoft SQL Server 2005 uses the SQLCLR (SQL Server Common Language Runtime) to host managed .NET assemblies in the database, while prior versions of SQL Server were restricted to unmanaged extended stored procedures primarily written in C. PostgreSQL lets users write functions in a wide variety of languages—including Perl, Python, Tcl, JavaScript (PL/V8) and C.

Interoperability and standardization

Overview
SQL implementations are incompatible between vendors and do not necessarily completely follow standards. In particular, date and time syntax, string concatenation, NULLs, and comparison case sensitivity vary from vendor to vendor. PostgreSQL and Mimer SQL strive for standards compliance, though PostgreSQL does not adhere to the standard in all cases. For example, the folding of unquoted names to lower case in PostgreSQL is incompatible with the SQL standard, which says that unquoted names should be folded to upper case. Thus, Foo should be equivalent to FOO not foo according to the standard.

Popular implementations of SQL commonly omit support for basic features of Standard SQL, such as the DATE or TIME data types.  The most obvious such examples, and incidentally the most popular commercial and proprietary SQL DBMSs, are Oracle (whose DATE behaves as DATETIME, and lacks a TIME type) and MS SQL Server (before the 2008 version). As a result, SQL code can rarely be ported between database systems without modifications.

Reasons for incompatibility
Several reasons for the lack of portability between database systems include:

 The complexity and size of the SQL standard means that most implementers do not support the entire standard.
 The standard does not specify database behavior in several important areas (e.g. indices, file storage), leaving implementations to decide how to behave.
 The SQL standard precisely specifies the syntax that a conforming database system must implement. However, the standard's specification of the semantics of language constructs is less well-defined, leading to ambiguity.
 Many database vendors have large existing customer bases; where the newer version of the SQL standard conflicts with the prior behavior of the vendor's database, the vendor may be unwilling to break backward compatibility.
 Little commercial incentive exists for vendors to make changing database suppliers easier (see vendor lock-in).
 Users evaluating database software tend to place other factors such as performance higher in their priorities than standards conformance.

Standardization history
SQL was adopted as a standard by the ANSI in 1986 as SQL-86 and the ISO in 1987. It is maintained by ISO/IEC JTC 1, Information technology, Subcommittee SC 32, Data management and interchange.

Until 1996, the National Institute of Standards and Technology (NIST) data-management standards program certified SQL DBMS compliance with the SQL standard. Vendors now self-certify the compliance of their products.

The original standard declared that the official pronunciation for "SQL" was an initialism:  ("ess cue el"). The SQL standard has gone through a number of revisions:

Current standard
The standard is commonly denoted by the pattern: ISO/IEC DIS 9075-n:yyyy Part n: title, or, as a shortcut, ISO/IEC 9075 (The term 'DIS' is not used in older versions). Interested parties may purchase the standards documents from ISO, IEC, or ANSI. Some old drafts are freely available.

ISO/IEC 9075 is complemented by ISO/IEC 13249: SQL Multimedia and Application Packages and some Technical reports.

Anatomy of SQL Standard
The SQL standard is divided into 10 parts, but with gaps in the numbering due to the withdrawal of outdated parts.
 ISO/IEC 9075-1:2016 Part 1: Framework (SQL/Framework). It provides logical concepts.
 ISO/IEC 9075-2:2016 Part 2: Foundation (SQL/Foundation). It contains the most central elements of the language and consists of both mandatory and optional features.
 ISO/IEC 9075-3:2016 Part 3: Call-Level Interface (SQL/CLI). It defines interfacing components (structures, procedures, variable bindings) that can be used to execute SQL statements from applications written in Ada, C respectively C++, COBOL, Fortran, MUMPS, Pascal or PL/I. (For Java see part 10.) SQL/CLI is defined in such a way that SQL statements and SQL/CLI procedure calls are treated as separate from the calling application's source code. Open Database Connectivity is a well-known superset of SQL/CLI. This part of the standard consists solely of mandatory features.
 ISO/IEC 9075-4:2016 Part 4: Persistent stored modules (SQL/PSM). It standardizes procedural extensions for SQL, including flow of control, condition handling, statement condition signals and resignals, cursors and local variables, and assignment of expressions to variables and parameters. In addition, SQL/PSM formalizes the declaration and maintenance of persistent database language routines (e.g., "stored procedures"). This part of the standard consists solely of optional features.
 ISO/IEC 9075-9:2016 Part 9: Management of External Data (SQL/MED). It provides extensions to SQL that define foreign-data wrappers and datalink types to allow SQL to manage external data. External data is data that is accessible to, but not managed by, an SQL-based DBMS. This part of the standard consists solely of optional features.
 ISO/IEC 9075-10:2016 Part 10: Object language bindings (SQL/OLB). It defines the syntax and semantics of SQLJ, which is SQL embedded in Java (see also part 3). The standard also describes mechanisms to ensure binary portability of SQLJ applications and specifies various Java packages and their contained classes. This part of the standard consists solely of optional features. Unlike SQL/OLB JDBC defines an API and is not part of the SQL standard.
 ISO/IEC 9075-11:2016 Part 11: Information and definition schemas (SQL/Schemata). It defines the Information Schema and Definition Schema, providing a common set of tools to make SQL databases and objects self-describing. These tools include the SQL object identifier, structure and integrity constraints, security and authorization specifications, features and packages of ISO/IEC 9075, support of features provided by SQL-based DBMS implementations, SQL-based DBMS implementation information and sizing items, and the values supported by the DBMS implementations. This part of the standard contains both mandatory and optional features.
 ISO/IEC 9075-13:2016 Part 13: SQL Routines and types using the Java TM programming language (SQL/JRT). It specifies the ability to invoke static Java methods as routines from within SQL applications ('Java-in-the-database'). It also calls for the ability to use Java classes as SQL structured user-defined types. This part of the standard consists solely of optional features.
 ISO/IEC 9075-14:2016 Part 14: XML-Related Specifications (SQL/XML). It specifies SQL-based extensions for using XML in conjunction with SQL. The XML data type is introduced, as well as several routines, functions, and XML-to-SQL data type mappings to support manipulation and storage of XML in an SQL database. This part of the standard consists solely of optional features.
ISO/IEC 9075-15:2019 Part 15: Multi-dimensional arrays (SQL/MDA). It specifies a multidimensional array type (MDarray) for SQL, along with operations on MDarrays, MDarray slices, MDarray cells, and related features. This part of the standard consists solely of optional features.

Extensions to the SQL Standard
ISO/IEC 9075 is complemented by ISO/IEC 13249 SQL Multimedia and Application Packages. This closely related but separate standard is developed by the same committee. It defines interfaces and packages based on SQL. The aim is unified access to typical database applications like text, pictures, data mining, or spatial data.

 ISO/IEC 13249-1:2016 Part 1: Framework
 ISO/IEC 13249-2:2003 Part 2: Full-Text
 ISO/IEC 13249-3:2016 Part 3: Spatial
 ISO/IEC 13249-5:2003 Part 5: Still image
 ISO/IEC 13249-6:2006 Part 6: Data mining
 ISO/IEC 13249-7:2013 Part 7: History
 ISO/IEC 13249-8:xxxx Part 8: Metadata Registry Access  MRA (work in progress)

Technical reports
ISO/IEC 9075 is also accompanied by a series of Technical Reports, published as ISO/IEC TR 19075. These Technical Reports explain the justification for and usage of some features of SQL, giving examples where appropriate. The Technical Reports are non-normative; if there is any discrepancy from 9075, the text in 9075 holds. Currently available 19075 Technical Reports are:

 ISO/IEC TR 19075-1:2011 Part 1: XQuery Regular Expression Support in SQL
 ISO/IEC TR 19075-2:2015 Part 2: SQL Support for Time-Related Information
 ISO/IEC TR 19075-3:2015 Part 3: SQL Embedded in Programs using the Java programming language
 ISO/IEC TR 19075-4:2015 Part 4: SQL with Routines and types using the Java programming language
 ISO/IEC TR 19075-5:2016 Part 5: Row Pattern Recognition in SQL
 ISO/IEC TR 19075-6:2017 Part 6: SQL support for JavaScript Object Notation (JSON)
 ISO/IEC TR 19075-7:2017 Part 7: Polymorphic table functions in SQL
 ISO/IEC TR 19075-8:2019 Part 8: Multi-Dimensional Arrays (SQL/MDA)
 ISO/IEC TR 19075-9:2020 Part 9: Online analytic processing (OLAP) capabilities

Alternatives
A distinction should be made between alternatives to SQL as a language, and alternatives to the relational model itself.  Below are proposed relational alternatives to the SQL language.  See navigational database and NoSQL for alternatives to the relational model.

 .QL: object-oriented Datalog
 4D Query Language (4D QL)
 Datalog: critics suggest that Datalog has two advantages over SQL: it has cleaner semantics, which facilitates program understanding and maintenance, and it is more expressive, in particular for recursive queries.
 HTSQL: URL based query method
 IBM Business System 12 (IBM BS12): one of the first fully relational database management systems, introduced in 1982
 ISBL
 jOOQ: SQL implemented in Java as an internal domain-specific language
 Java Persistence Query Language (JPQL): The query language used by the Java Persistence API and Hibernate persistence library
 JavaScript: MongoDB implements its query language in a JavaScript API.
 LINQ: Runs SQL statements written like language constructs to query collections directly from inside .Net code
 Object Query Language
 QBE (Query By Example) created by Moshè Zloof, IBM 1977
 QUEL introduced in 1974 by the U.C. Berkeley Ingres project, closer to tuple relational calculus than SQL
 XQuery

Distributed SQL processing
Distributed Relational Database Architecture (DRDA) was designed by a workgroup within IBM from 1988 to 1994. DRDA enables network-connected relational databases to cooperate to fulfill SQL requests.

An interactive user or program can issue SQL statements to a local RDB and receive tables of data and status indicators in reply from remote RDBs. SQL statements can also be compiled and stored in remote RDBs as packages and then invoked by package name. This is important for the efficient operation of application programs that issue complex, high-frequency queries. It is especially important when the tables to be accessed are located in remote systems.

The messages, protocols, and structural components of DRDA are defined by the Distributed Data Management Architecture. Distributed SQL processing ala DRDA is distinctive from contemporary distributed SQL databases.

Criticisms

Design

SQL deviates in several ways from its theoretical foundation, the relational model and its tuple calculus.  In that model, a table is a set of tuples, while in SQL, tables and query results are lists of rows; the same row may occur multiple times, and the order of rows can be employed in queries (e.g. in the LIMIT clause).
Critics argue that SQL should be replaced with a language that returns strictly to the original foundation: for example, see The Third Manifesto.

Orthogonality and completeness
Early specifications did not support major features, such as primary keys. Result sets could not be named, and subqueries had not been defined. These were added in 1992.

The lack of sum types has been described as a roadblock to full use of SQL's user-defined types. JSON support, for example, needed to be added by a new standard in 2016.

Null
The concept of Null is the subject of some debates. The Null marker indicates the absence of a value, and is distinct from a value of 0 for an integer column or an empty string for a text column. The concept of Nulls enforces the 3-valued-logic in SQL, which is a concrete implementation of the general 3-valued logic.

Duplicates
Another popular criticism is that it allows duplicate rows, making integration with languages such as Python, whose data types might make accurately representing the data difficult,  in terms of parsing and by the absence of modularity.
This is usually avoided by declaring a primary key, or a unique constraint, with one or more columns that uniquely identify a row in the table.

Impedance mismatch
In a similar sense to object–relational impedance mismatch,  a mismatch occurs between the declarative SQL language and the procedural languages in which SQL is typically embedded.

SQL data types
The SQL standard defines three kinds of data types:
 predefined data types
 constructed types
 user-defined types.

Constructed types are one of ARRAY, MULTISET, REF(erence), or ROW. User-defined types are comparable to classes in object-oriented language with their own constructors, observers, mutators, methods, inheritance, overloading, overwriting, interfaces, and so on. Predefined data types are intrinsically supported by the implementation.

Predefined data types

 Character types
 Character (CHAR)
 Character varying (VARCHAR)
 Character large object (CLOB)
 National character types
 National character (NCHAR)
 National character varying (NCHAR VARYING)
 National character large object (NCLOB)
 Binary types
 Binary (BINARY)
 Binary varying (VARBINARY)
 Binary large object (BLOB)
 Numeric types
 Exact numeric types (NUMERIC, DECIMAL, SMALLINT, INTEGER, BIGINT)
 Approximate numeric types (FLOAT, REAL, DOUBLE PRECISION)
 Decimal floating-point type (DECFLOAT)
 Datetime types (DATE, TIME, TIMESTAMP)
 Interval type (INTERVAL)
 Boolean
 XML
 JSON

See also
 Wikibook SQL
 Object database
 List of relational database management systems
 Comparison of relational database management systems
 Comparison of object–relational database management systems
 Query by Example
 SQL syntax
 Oracle PL/SQL
 Microsoft Transact-SQL (T-SQL)
 Online transaction processing (OLTP)
 Online analytical processing (OLAP)
 Data warehouse
 Relational data stream management system
 NoSQL
 MUMPS
 Hierarchical database model
 Star schema
 Snowflake schema

Notes

References

Sources

 
 Discussion on alleged SQL flaws (C2 wiki)
 C. J. Date with Hugh Darwen: A Guide to the SQL standard : a users guide to the standard database language SQL, 4th ed., Addison Wesley, USA 1997,

External links

 1995 SQL Reunion: People, Projects, and Politics, by Paul McJones (ed.): transcript of a reunion meeting devoted to the personal history of relational databases and SQL.
 American National Standards Institute. X3H2 Records, 1978–1995 Charles Babbage Institute Collection documents the H2 committee's development of the NDL and SQL standards.
 Oral history interview with Donald D. Chamberlin Charles Babbage Institute In this oral history Chamberlin recounts his early life, his education at Harvey Mudd College and Stanford University, and his work on relational database technology. Chamberlin was a member of the System R research team and, with Raymond F. Boyce, developed the SQL database language. Chamberlin also briefly discusses his more recent research on XML query languages.

 
Articles with example SQL code
Data modeling languages
Declarative programming languages
Programming languages with an ISO standard
Query languages
Relational database management systems
Data-centric programming languages
Programming languages created in 1974